GT Bicycles is an American company that designs and manufactures BMX, mountain, and road bicycles. GT is a division of the Dutch conglomerate Pon Holdings, which also markets Cannondale, Schwinn, Mongoose, IronHorse, DYNO, and RoadMaster bicycle brands; all manufactured in Asia.

GT was founded in 1972, by Gary Turner and Richard Long in Santa Ana, California, and was noted at its inception for spearheading the prominence of BMX bicycles, later for developing a range of bikes around its "triple triangle" design, and at the end of its independent history, winning a commission to manufacture a $30,000 carbon fiber "Superbike" for the 1996 Summer games.  GT sponsored numerous race teams and individuals, including noted riders Rebecca Twigg and Juli Furtado.

In 1998, the company went public and subsequently merged with Questor Partners, then owner of Schwinn.  The conglomerate went bankrupt in 2001 and was acquired by Pacific Cycle, which was in turn acquired by Dorel Industries in 2004.

GT is noted for innovative BMX designs and their "triple triangle" hard-tail mountain bike frame design — where seat stays are parallel to the downtube and attached to the top tube forward of the seat tube, rather than directly at the seat tube.  The company often uses a frame design where the bike's top tube extends rearward past the seat tube, claimed to reduce the vibration transferred to the seat from the rear wheel.  Later versions would have "GT" stamped on the end of the extended top tube.

Company History

Origins 1972-1979
GT bicycles began in 1972 when professional drag racer and experienced welder Gary Turner makes a frame for his son Craig Turner in his Fullerton, California garage to race at the BMX track. Most frames used during this period were modified Schwinn Stingrays which were heavy and broke easily under the stress of BMX racing and jumping. Gary Turner made his frames from 4130 chrome-moly tubing, the same tubing used in building chassis for dragsters which is stronger and lighter than regular carbon steel. Craig's bike gets noticed at the BMX track and Gary starts making frames for other kids.

In 1976 Gary Turner begins producing frames for Pedals Ready, a Pro Shop at the Western Sports-A-Rama BMX track in Orange County, California named and marketed as Pedals Ready/GT. These are the first commercially distributed Gary Turner produced frames and one of the first sponsored riders to use them was Greg A. Hill whose father owned the Pedals Ready bike shop. Aware of the popularity of Gary Turner’s BMX frames, Richard Long contacts Turner in 1977 about supplying his Anaheim, California bicycle shop. Turner agrees and the foundation of GT Bicycles is born. These early frames were not yet the GT brand, but were simply called "Gary Turner" as seen by the frame stickers. Things happened fast and soon Richard and Gary invested in a manufacturing warehouse dedicated to making top quality Cro-moly BMX frames in Santa Ana, California. In 1979 they incorporated into GT Bicycles, Inc. GT standing for the initials of its founder, Gary Turner. Richard sold his bike shop and began selling frames as fast as possible to bicycle distributors across the USA and into Europe. Richard headed the business and marketing aspects of the company while Gary was the engineer and production head.

GT Bicycles Inc.

In 1980 GT Bicycles Inc. releases their first bike the “GT Pro” and begins to sponsor BMX racers such as Lee Medlin and Denny Davidow. GT’s first magazine ad appears in Bicycle Motocross Action (BMX Action) in the January 1980 issue.

For the 1981 season GT releases five models: Junior, Expert, 24, 26 and Pro. The models stay this way until 1984 when they introduce their first freestyle bike the Pro Performer.

In 1983 GT signs freestyle BMX riders Bob Morales and Eddie Fiola to design and eventually ride a new freestyle bike the Pro Performer. At the time, the Performer was the only other dedicated freestyle bike besides the Haro Freestyler. The unique bent down tube was instantly recognizable and a design and marketing game changer which became a trademark look for GT. Bob Morales eventually left GT to focus on his own company DYNO Designs while Eddie Fiola became arguably the most famous and popular BMX personality of the 1980s until his contract was not renewed in 1987.

In 1985 GT bought BMX accessories and apparel company Dyno. Bob Morales said "GT Bicycles made an offer to buy Dyno. I accepted their offer because Dyno was severely under-capitalized and in need of investment. I negotiated a contract with GT to design bicycle frames and components and to consult on a marketing strategy for them." Morales developed a line of Dyno frames and bicycles for GT. Dyno also produced a line of clothing apparel and shoes under the Dyno brand. 1985 also saw GT produce their first Mountain bike for the emerging sport and market.

Robinson Racing was acquired by GT Bicycles in 1987 from founder Chuck Robinson due to financial troubles with the company. Chuck went to work for GT and did promotion for them as well as heading up the South America sales because he spoke Spanish as well as other languages. Robinson Racing was founded in the late 1970s after Chuck worked for DG BMX and Webco Bikes Inc.

In 1989 GT Bicycles acquires Auburn Cycles another company that Bob Morales started along with Todd Huffman only one year earlier. Originally Auburn was going to be Honda Cycles but the Honda Motor corp. pulled out at the last minute declining to license the name. Bob and Todd continued with the project and Huffman came up with the Auburn name and Bob designed the original logo. When Auburn merged into GT Huffman was hired by GT to manage the brand in addition to his Marketing Director title. GT produced Auburn frames and bicycles until 1997.

Also in 1989 GT acquired Powerlite. Powerlite was founded in 1977 by Steve Rink in Orange County, California as a frame for Peddlepower bike shop called the Peddlepower SR. In early 1979 this would change and the decals would read Powerlite. The company name was resurrected as an independent in 2002 as Powerlite Bicycles USA which produces BMX racing bikes and accessories.

Ownership Change & Public Offering
With lost public interest in the sport of BMX and declining sales, Long and Turner sold a controlling interest to Boston-based investment firm Bain Capital in 1993, which then took the company public in October 1995.

In 1996, GT won the commission to manufacture a highly aerodynamic bike design that would later become known as the "Superbike" and later banned by Olympic regulations. A byproduct of a year-long development program with the U.S. national team known as Project '96, the bike featured a carbon graphite frame with no top tube, extremely thin seat and downtubes, a seat tube with a deep cutout to accommodate the rear wheel, as well as differently sized aerodynamic wheels. Describing the bike, the U.S. Cycling Federation's track endurance coach Craig Griffin said "it's so thin and light, and it's as strong as anything built. It's so aerodynamic that when you look at it from the front, it disappears." Controversially, just prior to the 1996 Summer Olympics, Rebecca Twigg quit the team, citing her Superbike's ill fit as one of the reasons for departing.

On October 11, 1996, GT announced that it had reached an agreement with Nike whereby Nike would be an official sponsor for all of GT's bicycle racing teams in 1997. Under the new agreement, all GT team athletes would use Nike shoes and after-race apparel. This new sponsorship agreement represented an expansion of Nike's current sponsorship as the official shoe of the GT mountain bike team by then CEO Michael Haynes. GT Bicycles had the first and the only mountain bike and BMX teams that are sponsored by Nike. GT had a total of 57 athletes on various teams in 1997, including nine mountain bike racers, 32 BMX racers and 16 freestyle/GT Bicycle Air Show performers.

A week before GT's debut at the 1996 Summer Olympics, GT co-founder Richard Long was killed on July 12 in a motorcycle accident on his Honda Valkyrie en route to a national championship series race for the National Off-Road Bicycle Association at Big Bear Lake in the San Bernardino mountains.

At the time of Long's death, GT maintained an office at the factory in Santa Ana as well as a factory in Huntington Beach — and manufactured 600,000 bicycles annually under the GT, Powerlite, Robinson and Dyno brands, distributed bikes, parts and accessories via its Riteway network and had annual revenues of $150 million.

Less than two years after Long's death, in 1998, Bain Capital sold GT to another investment group, Questor Partners, which at the time also owned Schwinn, for $175 million. Nearly five years to the day that Richard Long had died, Questor would file for bankruptcy on June 27, 2001, and was acquired by Pacific Cycle, which was in turn acquired by Canadian company Dorel Industries in 2004, and subsequently acquired by Pon Holdings in 2021.

Teams

As well as the manufacturing of bicycles, GT Bikes sponsored several teams competing in BMX, mountain and road competitions.

GT Factory BMX Racing Team

There are currently two riders on the BMX Race Team: Jonas Harmon and Dougie Butcher which compete in competitions held globally.

GT BMX Freestyle Team (GT Air Show)

Along with Team Haro, Team GT helped shape the future of BMX Freestyle and helped pioneer a sport once deemed nothing more than a fad.  GT produced some of the first Freestyle specific bikes in their early Pro Performer and World Tour models.  Later highly successful models were the Pro Freestyle Tour, which saw the first use of mountain bike style brake mounts for use of Dia-Compe 990, the Dyno Pro Compe - one of the most ridden flatland frames of the early Nineties.  GT was also there for the birth of street riding in the late Eighties with the GT Aggressor (Designed in California, but frames made in Taiwan) and Dyno Slammer bashguard models.  GT also designed and sold the first flatland specific bike in the USA: the GT Show.

The GT BMX brand and team riders appear in the 'HellTrack' starting lineup scene in the BMX cult-classic film Rad.  Famous names from the ranks of Teams past include X-Games Champions Dave Mirra, Jay Miron, Jamie Bestwick, along with pioneers Eddie 'King of the Skateparks' Fiola, Brian 'Rad Dad' Scura inventor of the Gyro, aka SST Oryg, Trevor Meyer, Joey 'Phenom' Phee, Martin 'The Chairman' Aparijo, Josh 'Dr. Air' White, Dino DeLuca, Dave Voelker, Brett Hernandez, Kevin Jones, Mark Eaton, Gary Pollak, Kevin 'The Gute' Gutierrez, Ruben Castillo, Robert Castillo, Jason Geoffery, Terryll Loffler, Bill Neuman, Goro Tamai, Krys Dauchy, and Adam Jung.

GT Bike's current Freestyle Team includes the riders:  Dan Conway, Albert Mercado, Leandro Moriera, Tate Roskelley, 'Mad' Mike Guth,  Rob Wise and Brian Kachinsky.

Mountain Team
Eight riders in the Mountain Team, compete in global competitions including downhill, four-cross, trials, freeride and dirt jumping.  The riders in the team are: Marc Beaumont, Hans Rey, Eric Carter, Roger Rinderknecht, Kevin Aiello, and Tyler McCaul.  In 2012, GT added Kyle Strait, Dan Atherton, Gee Atherton, and Rachel Atherton to the team.

Hans Rey has been sponsored by GT since 1987.

Road Team
GT Bikes briefly served as team sponsors and bike supplier for Jelly Belly professional cycling team.  After the 2009 season, the team ended their relationship with GT and began riding Focus bikes. 
Lotto pro cycling team (now Lotto-Belisol) at one time had Easton aluminium tubing GT frames.  The team now rides on Ridley carbon frames.

Co – Factory Team
The Co – Factory Team was founded in 2008.  The team is composed of riders from across the US riding for local dealer teams that represent GT Bicycles.

Notable past Factory team members
Gary Ellis, Greg Hill, Rick Webb, Trevor Meyer, Geoff Scofield, Tommy Brackens, Mike King, Gabe Weed, Lee Medlin, Andy Patterson, "Chicken" George Seevers, Dave Voelker, Alexis Vergara, Terry Tenette, Randy Stumpfhauser, Thomas Allier, Mike Luna, In Hee Lee, Dave Brumlow, David Milham, Tom Haugen, Eddie Livingston, Danny Nelson, Josh White, Eddie Fiola, and Bob Morales.  Past mountain bike team riders include Eric Carter, and Brian Lopes.

Dyno Girls
In the Questor Partners era 1998-2001, GT Bicycles published a Kustom Kruisers Katalog, featuring the Dyno Kustom Kruisers and “The Loveley and Talented Dyno Girls” (from the Brand Model and Talent Agency, of Santa Ana, California).  The team of Dyno Girls consisted of: Amy (not Weber), Brooke, Mikyla and Theresa in 1999; Brooke (shake w/ fries), Gabrielle, Linda, Mikyla and Tiffany (T-bucket) in 2000; Amy Weber, Denise, Jill and Kelly in 2001.

Models

Beach Cruisers

 Dyno Glide
 Dyno Deluxe (springer fork)
 Moto Glide (purple, multi-speed)
 Ultra Glide (tank)
 Glide Seven (derailer)
 Dyno Deuce (red or black, with flames)
 Moon Eyes® (yellow/black; promotional)
 Von Franco (orange)hu
 Taboo Tiki (green)
 Dyno Roadster (stretch)

BMX Racing

 16 (1981-1984) 
 24 (1981-1995)
 Expert (1981-1985)
 Gary Turner (1976–79)
 Hot Wheels (2001)
 Interceptor (1986-2012, 2013-2015 frame only)
 Interceptor Jr. (1990-1995)
 Interceptor 26 (2013-2014) 
 Junior (1983-1984)
 Mach One (1984-2012, 2017)
 Mach One 16FW (2016-)
 Mach One 24 (1997-2013)
 Mach One Junior (2001-2008, 2010-2012, 2018-)
 Mach One Mini (1992-1997, 2009-2012, 2017-)
 Mach One Expert (2009-2012, 2015, 2018-)
 Mach One Pro (2009-2011, 2015-)
 Mach One Pro 24 (2009, 2011, 2015-)
 Mach Two (1995-1998)
 Mini (1981-1984)
 Power Series (1998-2018)
 Power Series 0.5 (2001)
 Power Series 1.0 (1998-2001)
 Power Series 3.0 (1998-2001)
 Power Series 24 (1993-2014)
 Power Series Expert (2001-2012)
 Power Series Expert XL (2013)
 Power Series Jr. (2010-2012)
 Power Series Micro (2009-2012)
 Power Series Mini (2012)
 Power Series Pro (2009-2011)
 Power Series Ultra Box (2009)
 Power Series Ultra Box 2 (2009)
 Power Series Ultra Box Team (2009)
 Power Series XL (2009-2010)
 Power Series Pro XL (2011-2012)
 Pro (1980-1984) Frame and fork only in 1985-1986
 Pro Elite Frame & Fork (1992-1995)
 Pro Series (1984-1996, 1998-2017)
 Pro Series 24 (1998-2007, 2013-2017)
 Pro Series Expert (2013-2015)
 Pro Series Expert XL (2014)
 Pro Series Jr. (1990-1996, 2013-2016)
 Pro Series Micro (1999-2001, 2013-2017)
 Pro Series Mini (1998-2001, 2013-2016)
 Pro Series Pro 24 (2013-)
 Pro Series Team (1987-1996)
 Pro Series XL (2001-?, 2013-2016)
 Pro Series XXL (2001-?, 2016)
 Raider (1997)
 Speed Series (1996-?)
 Speed Series 20 (2017)
 Speed Series 24 (1997-2016)
 Speed Series Jr. (1997-2003)
 Speed Series Team (1996-1999)
 Speed Series Team Expert (1999)
 Speed Series XL (1996-2015)
 Speed Series Expert (2018-)
 Speed Series Expert XL (2018-)
 Speed Series JR (2018-)
 Speed Series Micro (2018-)
 Speed Series Mini (2018-)
 Speed Series Pro (2013-)
 Speed Series Pro 24 (2013-)
 Speed Series Pro 26 (2013)
 Speed Series Pro XL (2011-)
 Speed Series Pro XXL (2014-)
 Speed Series Pro XXXL (2014-)
 Team I (1983)
 Team II (1983)
 Team Series (1984–85)

BMX Dirt/Trail
 Bump (1999-2014)
 Cage (2013-2014 Frame only)
 Fly (2001-2014)
 Fly 18" (2012-2014)
 Fly 16" (2012-2014)
 Fueler (1994-2014)
 Fueler 22 (2020-)
 Steed (2010) Frame only
 Thumper (2000-2005)
 XR (2001)

BMX Freestyle

 Aggressor (1990-1991)
 Aggressor Team (1990-1991)
 Air (2008-2016, 2019-)
 Bestwick Pro (2001-2006)
 BK (2016)
 BK Team (2016-2020)
 BK Team Compe (2017-2020)
 BK Team Signature (2016-2020)
 BK XL (2016)
 Calafia (2009-2011)
 Compe (2009-2011, 2013-2014)
 Conway Team (2018-)
 Conway Team Compe (2018-)
 Conway Team Signature (2019-)
 DLSY (2015)
 DLSY Signature (2015)
 DLSY XL (2015)
 El Centro (2009-2011)
 El Centro 18 (2009-2011)
 El Centro 16 (2009-2011)
 Encore (2005, 2008-2009)
 Finale (2005-2011)
 Grind (2001)
 JPL Team (2018)
 JPL Team Compe (2018)
 La Chiva (2010 Frame only, 2011)
 Mercado Team (2019-)
 Mercado Team Compe (2019-)
 Performer (1985-)
 Performer Jr. 18" (1986-1995, 2015-)
 Performer Lil 16" (2017-) 
 Phelan - Team Comp, Team (2017)
 Pro Performer (1984-1989, 1997-2000) The 1997 model was only available in Europe and Australia.
 Pro Freestyle Tour (1987-1997)
 Pro Freestyle Tour Team (1987-1997)
 Pro World Tour (1985-1986)
 Ricochet (2012, 2014)
 Vertigo (1988-2008)
 Show (1998-2002)
 Slammer (2009-)
 Slammer XL (2016)
 Tour (1998-2006)
 Tour 2 (1999-2001)
 Voelker (2001)
 Wise (2015-2016)
 Wise Team (2016-2017)
 Wise Team Compe(2015)
 Wise Signature (2016-2017)
 Wise Team Signature (2016-2017)
 Wise XL (2015-2016)
 Zone (2009-2014)
 Zoot (1987-1988) A freestyle scooter in both 12" and 14" models.

BMX Heritage/Retro
 Performer 26 (2013-2014, 2018-)
 Pro Performer (2018-)
 Pro Performer 26 (2014, 2017-)
 Pro Performer 29 (2018-)
 Pro Series 24 (2020-)
 Pro Series 26 (2020-)
 Pro Series 29 (2018-)
 Street Performer 29 (2018-)

Road and Mountain
 Aggressor (Polished aluminum hardtail)
 Aggressor 20 and 24 (Boys version of the hardtail adult bike)
 Arrowhead (Aluminum hardtail)
 Avalanche (All Mountain hardtail)
 Backwoods (Aluminum hardtail)
 Borrego (Steel hardtail)
 Bravado (True Temper chromoly steel hardtail - higher spec compared to Karakoram)
 Bullet (1993-1995)
 CHUCKER (Aluminum dirt jumper)
 Chucker (Freeride/dirt jump hardtail)
 Course (Very rare road, Reynolds 853)
 Crossover line (1991) consisting of Tachyon (drop bars) and Continuum (flat bars) which had very rare 700D wheel sizes and SunTour/DiaCompe components
 DHi (Downhill bikes)
 Distortion (Dual suspension slopestyle and 4X bike)
 Edge (Road Series)
 Force
 Fury (Unique full carbon downhill frame)
 Grade (Gravel bike line)
 GTR Series 2.0 (Road, comfort,carbon fiber, Ultegra)
 Helion (Full suspension cross country)
 Hybrid 20 (1988-1991) BMX and MTN bike crossover
 Hybris 24 (1990)
 iT-1 (Downhill/freeride dual suspension)
 Karakoram (Steel hardtail)
 Kashmir 1.0 - 3.0(CroMo/Steel hardtail)
 La Bomba (4X hardtail)
 Laguna 20 and 24 (Girls version of the Aggressor 20 and 24)
 Lightning
 Lightning (Titanium hardtail)
 Little Timber (1995)
 GT Full Suspension Mountain Bike Development - RTS, LTS, and XCR I-Drive Series Developed in conjunction with Jim Busby, Suspension Design Engineer
See "Full Travel - GT's Suspension Development Story", published on Youtube in several parts EP 1-5.
 LTS (Full suspension)
 Marathon
 Outbound (1995)
 Outpost (Mountain hardtail) 
 Palomar 
 Pantera (All mountain hardtail)
 Psyclone (Fillet brazed steel hardtail)
 Psyclone (Hardtail - hand made steel frame from GT Tech Shop, True Temper and Reynolds 853)
 RAGE
 RAVE
 Rebound (Hardtail - steel, and then later aluminum)
 Richter 8 (Steel hardtail)
 Ricochet
 RTS (Full suspension)
 Ruckus (Freeride hardtail and Duallys also Dirtbikes)
 Saddleback Mountain (Hardtail)
 Sanction
 Sensor
 Slipstream (Comfort)
 STS (Carbonbikes)
 Talera (Mountain hardtail)
 Tempest
 Tequesta (Steel hardtail)
 Timberline/Nomad (Comfort)
 Transeo (Crossover)
 Vantara (Hardtail - steel and chormoly)
 Vengeance
 Xizang (1991, Hand polished titanium hardtail)
 Xizang 9r (2012, titanium hartail, 29")
 Zaskar (Hardtail - aluminum and recently carbon fibre)
 ZR Series road bikes with a numerical designation, the lowest being the best spec'd bike (i.e., a ZR 1.0 was a better quality bike than a ZR 4.0)
 ZRX (Cyclocross)

Trial
 Ricochet (1988)

GT also manufactured a series of highly regarded Track bikes
 GTB (General Track Bike)
 GT Pulse
 Jamie Skinner

See also
GT Factory Racing, aka Atherton Racing
List of BMX bicycle manufacturers

References

External links

Company website
GT Bicycles History
The 1996 GT Olympic Superbike
Czech official website

Mountain bike manufacturers
Cycle manufacturers of the United States
American companies established in 1979
Vehicle manufacturing companies established in 1979